The 1920 Kansas gubernatorial election was held on November 2, 1920. Incumbent Republican Henry Justin Allen defeated Democratic nominee Jonathan M. Davis with 58.44% of the vote.

General election

Candidates
Major party candidates 
Henry Justin Allen, Republican
Jonathan M. Davis, Democratic

Other candidates
Roy Stanton, Socialist

Results

References

1920
Kansas
Gubernatorial